While there is no Official Opposition in Holyrood, Ruth Davidson, as leader of the largest party not in government, acts as the Leader of the Opposition. She formed her shadow cabinet following the 2016 Scottish Parliament election, where the Scottish Conservatives replaced Scottish Labour as the largest non-governing party.

History 
Davidson was elected Leader of the Scottish Conservative Party in the 2011 leadership election. She led the secondary opposition frontbench from 2011 until the 2016 Scottish Parliament election. In the election, the Scottish Conservatives replaced the Scottish Labour as the largest party not in government.

In 2018, Davidson and her partner, Jen Wilson, announced they were expecting a baby. From 15 September 2018 to 3 May 2019, she went on leave and her opposition cabinet was led by Jackson Carlaw.

In 2019, Davidson resigned as Conservative leader and her shadow cabinet dissolved.

Shadow Cabinet

References

Notes

Citations 

British shadow cabinets
Politics of Scotland
Scottish Parliament